Robin Pedley (11 August 1914 – 20 November 1988) was a British educationist whose publication laid much of the foundations of comprehensive education in the United Kingdom.

Early life
He was born Robert Pedley to Edward Pedley, stonemason, and wife Martha, a postmistress; he was the third of four sons and a daughter. He was raised in Grinton, near Reeth, in the then North Riding of Yorkshire, and went to the local Fremington School. and then Reeth Friends School under head teacher Reginald Place. He was a pupil teacher until the system was abolished in 1928.

Pedley won an Ellerton Scholarship to Durham University, where he graduated with an upper-second in History and Economics in 1935. He gained his teaching certificate the following year, followed by a doctorate in 1939 - which he wrote on the political and economic history of the northern Pennines.

Career
From 1936 to 1938 he was a Research Fellow at the University of Durham. In 1937 he won the Gladstone Prize for Modern History and, in the same year, the Gibson Prize for Archaeology. From 1938 to 1942 he taught History at Great Ayton Friends' School, a Quaker independent boarding school. During the Second World War he was a conscientious objector. From 1946 to 1947 he taught Education at the College of St Mark & St John in London, now the University of St Mark & St John.

University of Leicester
From 1947 to 1963 he worked in the Department of Education at the University of Leicester.

At the University he began to develop his ideas on comprehensive schools, which he had visited from the early 1950s. By 1963 there were 175 comprehensive schools in England; around 5% of secondary schools. He believed, as did some others later on, that comprehensive schools helped social integration, and helped underprivileged children. He believed the grammar school system led to segregated education.

He believed in small schools in intimate communities, and did not like all-through schools from ages 11 to 19. He preferred two stages of secondary schools, from ages 11 to 15, then ages 15 to 19.

University of Exeter
From 1963 to 1971 he was Director of the Institute of Education at the University of Exeter, becoming a Professor in 1970.

University of Southampton
From 1971 to 1975 he was Head (Professor) of the School of Education and Dean of the Faculty of Education at the University of Southampton.

Publications
 Comprehensive Schools Today, 1955
 Comprehensive Education: a new approach, 1956
 The Comprehensive School, 1963 (3rd edition, 1978), Pelican Books; his most influential book, greatly popularising the idea of comprehensive schools.
 The Comprehensive School, 1966
 Towards the Comprehensive University, 1977

Personal life
He married in Leicester in 1951 and had a son, William (born 1953) and a daughter (born 1955). His son worked as a teacher, for Pearson Education, and later became a college Principal both in the UK and overseas. In his later life Robin Pedley lived at Brockenhurst, Hampshire. He died aged 74 in Wiltshire.

His daughter married in March 1984 in the New Forest District. His son married in July 1998 in the New Forest District. His son had a daughter in June 1998, and a son in December 2001 (named after his father). His son married a Dutch woman, and lived at Wellingborough in Northamptonshire.

See also
 Sir Graham Savage, similar advocate of comprehensive schools in the 1920s

References

External links
 Comprehensive pioneer

1914 births
1988 deaths
Academics of the University of Exeter
Academics of the University of Leicester
Academics of the University of Southampton
Alumni of University College, Durham
British conscientious objectors
Comprehensive education
Deaths from dementia in England
Deaths from Alzheimer's disease
English educational theorists
Schoolteachers from Yorkshire
British schoolteachers
People associated with Plymouth Marjon University
People from Brockenhurst